Sebastian Francis, DSPN, is the 5th and current Roman Catholic bishop of the Diocese of Penang. He is also currently president of the Catholic Bishops' Conference of Malaysia, Singapore and Brunei. He was appointed as Bishop of Penang by the Vatican on 7 July 2012. The Cathedral of the Holy Spirit in Green Lane, Penang is the seat of Bishop Francis, and the cathedral for the Roman Catholic Diocese of Penang.

Early life
Sebastian Francis was born on 11 November 1951 in Johor Bahru, Johor which was then a part of the Federation of Malaya. From the year 1967 to 1970, he joined the St. Francis Xavier's Minor Seminary in Singapore, before enrolling into College General, Penang from 1972 to 1976. He was ordained a priest for the Diocese of Malacca-Johor on 28 July 1977.

From 1981 to 1983, Francis obtained a licentiate in Dogmatic Theology from the University of St. Thomas Aquinas in Rome, Italy. He also studied at the Maryknoll School of Theology in New York, United States where he obtained a degree in Justice and Peace in 1991. He has also served as a Spiritual Director and formator in College General from 1991 to 1998.

In the year 2003, Francis was appointed as vicar general for the Diocese of Malacca-Johor, a position which he served until his appointment as the Bishop of Penang in 2012.

Appointment as Bishop
On 7 July 2012, the Vatican appointed Francis as the 5th Bishop of Penang. He succeeds Bishop Emeritus Antony Selvanayagam, whose resignation was accepted by the Pope.

The episcopal consecration of Francis was held on 20 August 2012 at St. Anne's Church in Bukit Mertajam, Penang. His principal consecrator was the Archbishop of Kuala Lumpur, Archbishop Emeritus Murphy Pakiam. His co-consecrators were Bishop Emeritus Antony Selvanayagam, his predecessor and Bishop Paul Tan Chee Ing from his former Diocese of Malacca-Johor. The event was witnessed by 10,000 Catholics and attended by the Chief Minister of Penang, Lim Guan Eng.

The motto of his episcopacy is "Fiat Voluntas Tua" ("Thy Will be Done" in English).

Honours
In 2016, the Penang State Governor, Yang di-Pertua Negeri Pulau Pinang TYT Tun Dato Seri Utama Haji Abdul Rahman Haji Abbas conferred the Darjah Setia Pangkuan Negeri (DSPN) award, which carries the title Datuk to Bishop Sebastian Francis.

See also
 Diocese of Malacca-Johor
 Diocese of Penang

External links

 Rt Rev Sebastian Francis
 Catholic-Hierarchy.org
 The Bishop
 Diocese of Penang

References

1951 births
Living people
People from Johor
Malaysian people of Indian descent
21st-century Roman Catholic bishops in Malaysia
Pontifical University of Saint Thomas Aquinas alumni
Maryknoll Seminary alumni